Bandido ("Bandit") is a 2004 action thriller film written by Scott Duncan and Carlos Gallardo and directed by Roger Christian.  The story revolves around the CIA framing skilled thief Max Cruz aka "Bandido" (Gallardo) in order to gain his cooperation in helping them recover intelligence data that was stolen by Beno Gildemontes (Kim Coates), a Mexican Crime lord.

Cast
 Carlos Gallardo as Max "Bandido" Cruz
 Edy Arellano as Armas
 Michel Bos as CIA Agent
 Kim Coates as Beno
 Matt Craven as Fletcher
 Marintia Escobedo as "Scar"
 Angie Everhart as Natalie
 Ana La Salvia as Sofia
 Karyme Lozano as Rosalia (as Carime Lozano)
 Wes Martinez as Max Barcus
 Verónica Segura as Delgado
 Manuel Vela as Peña
 Ernesto Yáñez as Quintana

Release and reception
The film was released December 10, 2004 by Innovation Film Group. Carlos Gallardo came up with the idea for the film directly after his involvement with cult classic El Mariachi.  He created that movie for a mere $7,000.

References

External links

2004 films
Films directed by Roger Christian
Mexican independent films
2004 action thriller films
American independent films
Mexican action thriller films
American action thriller films
2004 independent films
2000s English-language films
2000s American films
2000s Mexican films
English-language Mexican films